Schefflera multifoliolata is a species of plant in the family Araliaceae. It is a tree endemic to Sumatra. It is an endangered species threatened by habitat loss.

References

multifoliolata
Endemic flora of Sumatra
Trees of Sumatra
Endangered plants
Taxonomy articles created by Polbot